The Baden Masters is an annual men's curling tournament, held in early September/late August in Baden, Switzerland. It is the first curling tournament of the European Curling Champions Tour (CCT) season and is part of the World Curling Tour. It was first held in 2000 and it became a CCT event in 2005.

In 2021, for the first time in the event's twenty-one year history, two women's teams competed alongside the men's field: 2018 Olympic Gold Medalists Team Anna Hasselborg from Sweden and Team Irene Schori of Limmattal, Switzerland.

Past champions

References

External links

Baden Masters
World Curling Tour events
Champions Curling Tour events